Me Myself & I is a 1992 American romantic comedy film starring JoBeth Williams and George Segal.  The film is the directorial debut of Cuban-American graphic designer Pablo Ferro.  Bill Macy, Shelley Hack and Ruth Gilbert also appear in this independent film.

Plot

Buddy Arnett, a writer, falls in love with Diane, who suffers from multiple personality disorder. As he gets closer to her, must learn how to navigate her various, very different, sometimes volatile personalities.

Cast
JoBeth Williams ...  Crazy Diane / Sane Diane 
George Segal ...  Buddy Arnett 
Don Calfa ...  Irving 
Shelley Hack ...  Jennifer 
Betsy Lynn George ...  Jailbait 
Bill Macy ...  Sydney 
Sharon McNight ...  Jailbait's Mom 
Ruth Gilbert ...  Mrs. Landesman 
Cheryl Paris ...  Aunt Felicia 
Hartley Haverty ...  Kim Trombitas
Nicholas Kadi ...  Saudi Prince 
Jaid Barrymore ...  Lucy Lindell 
Sheila Scott-Wilkenson ...  Katherine 
Jennifer Ashley ...  T.V. Show Host 
Paul Cavonis ...  Ronnie Pauson (Award Presenter)

Production
Iconic singer-songwriter Harry Nilsson composed and performed the theme song, which played over the film's opening credit sequence.

References

External links
 

1992 films
Films set in New York City
American romantic comedy films
1992 romantic comedy films
1992 directorial debut films
1990s English-language films
1990s American films